Wild Dogz is a Puerto Rican record label founded by Alexis & Fido.

Artists
 Alexis & Fido
 Antony
 Player & Sisso
 Carlitos Prime
 Baroni
 Analise

Producers
 DJ Coffie
 Master Chris
 RKO
 Impulse
 Lenny 357 & Smash (MKP)

Discography

Puerto Rican record labels
Reggaeton record labels
Puerto Rican brands